Canesius Bizimana (born 15 January 1984) is a Rwandan footballer. He played in three matches for the Rwanda national football team in 2003 and 2004. He was also named in Rwanda's squad for the 2004 African Cup of Nations tournament.

References

1984 births
Living people
Rwandan footballers
Rwanda international footballers
2004 African Cup of Nations players
Place of birth missing (living people)
Association football defenders
Mukura Victory Sports F.C. players